English Phonology and Phonological Theory: Synchronic and Diachronic Studies is a 1976 book by Roger Lass.

Reception
The book was reviewed by Richard M. Hogg and W. F. Koopman. Hogg believes that "this book may not quite fulfil the high standards which we may demand from this author, but the strengths far outweigh the weaknesses."

References

External links
English Phonology and Phonological Theory: Synchronic and Diachronic Studies
1976 non-fiction books
Phonology books
Linguistics textbooks
Cambridge University Press books
English phonology